The premiership of Nikol Pashinyan began on May 8, 2018, when Nikol Pashinyan was elected in a 59–42 vote by the National Assembly of Armenia to be the 16th Prime Minister of Armenia. Following the resignation of Serzh Sargsyan on April 23 due to mass protests in the country, Pashinyan was seen by the demonstrators as the best possible successor that has no ties to the previous government. His nomination was contested by the republican majority during a vote on May 1, but was finally accepted during a second hearing a week later.

Background

Pashinyan arrived to power as the main leader of the 2018 waves of mass protests in Armenia. The movement started in late March 2018 to dissuade outgoing president Serj Sargsyan from wanting to become Prime Minister. After Sargsyan was nominated by the Republican Party of Armenia to be their candidate for Prime Minister, the protests expanded to the whole country, and even in some cities where there is an Armenian Diaspora presence.

After getting elected, Pashinyan promised to make swift changes to the country's economy and to crack down on corruption.

Election and formation of the first cabinet

Pashinyan's party, Way Out Alliance, made a deal with the two other opposition parties in parliament, the Armenian Revolutionary Federation(ARF) and the Prosperous Armenia party, to have a minority coalition government. The first post-revolution cabinet was formed on May 12, 2018, and consisted of 17 ministries, 2 of which are administered by the ARF and 4 by Prosperous Armenia. Pashinyan also appointed a new police commissioner, National Security Service director, and head investigator for the State Inspection Service.

Pashinyan was soon criticized for letting Azerbaijan make territorial gains on the Armenia-Nakhichevan border during the first weeks of his premiership. Despite not losing any ground to Azerbaijani troops, the Armenian units in the area have to deal with an enemy that is significantly closer to their positions and now has a view on the nearby village of Areni. After meeting during a CIS summit in Dushanbe, Pashinyan and Ilham Aliyev agreed to calm the situation on the border.

In July, the government started an anti-corruption crackdown against former officials and politicians. These include retired general Manvel Grigoryan, CSTO Secretary-General Yuri Khatchaturov, and former President Robert Kocharyan. While Grigoryan's and Kocharyan's arrests were seen as signs of the new government's will to fight against corruption, accusations against Khatchaturov were seen as a foreign policy failure, because of his important position in the military alliance.

Pashinyan, along with President Armen Sarkissian, attended the funeral of world-renowned French singer Charles Aznavour. Armenia was the host of the 17th Francophonie Summit that was held in Yerevan on October 11–12. During the summit, he gave several speeches in French.

After its two coalition partners, the ARF and Prosperous Armenia, supported a bill which will make it harder for the Prime Minister to call snap elections to the National Assembly, Pashinyan fired all six of their ministers in a cabinet reshuffle. Two weeks later, he resigned from his post, became acting Prime Minister, and demanded to the people on his Facebook page to block the gates of the National Assembly, so that its members can't come and vote for another candidate. This forced the electoral commission to call new parliamentary elections.

The 2018 Armenian parliamentary election took place on December 9, 2018, with 11 parties running for seats in the National Assembly. Pashinyan's party, My Step Alliance, garnished a majority of the vote, with 88 out of 132 seats. Prosperous Armenia won 26 seats, and Bright Armenia, led by Pashinyan's former ally Edmon Marukyan, won 18 seats. There was no large incident during the election, although they were reports of intimidation and collusion in favor of the My Step Alliance.

Formation of the second cabinet

After its election victory, Pashinyan formed a new government on January 14 consisting exclusively of members of his party and independent officials. He started talking about reducing the size of his cabinet. As a result of this restructure, 5 ministries were to be disbanded and combined with other ones to simplify government bureaucracy. The final model was proposed on February 1 and was approved by the parliament on March 8.

Armenia had its first case of COVID-19 on March 1, 2020. Pashinyan initially downplayed the disease and said that there was no need for a nationwide confinement. As Armenia's numbers began to have more and more cases, the Government declared a state of emergency on March 16 lasting until April 14, to prevent the spread of the coronavirus. Schools were ordered to close, gatherings with over 20 people were banned, and the 2020 Armenian constitutional referendum, one of Pashinyan's main objectives after the 2019 election, was postponed. The state of emergency was later extended until May 4.

On May 4, the national stay-at-home order was partially lifted and non-essential businesses were allowed to reopen, provided that the businesses require customers wear masks and limit the number of customers inside stores and restaurants. Because a large number of people didn't respect the social distancing rules, Armenia saw an explosion of coronavirus cases and on May 14, the Government reinstated the state of emergency and called everyone to respect the rules. Even after this call, some people dismissed the government's orders. On June 1, Pashinyan said via Facebook that he had contracted the virus, along with the rest of his family, although a few days later he said that he no longer has it, suggesting that it might have been made up. He ordered the police to fine anyone that is not respecting the rules set by the government and called for people to send him pictures of rule breakers to post it on his Facebook page.

Pashinyan's handling of the pandemic was harshly criticized by opposition parties, including its former coalition partners, the ARF and Prosperous Armenia. After opposition leader and millionaire Gagik Tsarukyan said that the government's response to the COVID-19 pandemic was inadequate, National Security Service investigators raided his house in what was seen as a crackdown on the opposition.

On June 23, the My Step faction of the parliament unanimously voted to approve the amendments that will require the head of the constitutional court, Hrayr Tovmasyan, to step down. The law was signed by the President the same evening. Opposition parties declared the legislation unconstitutional because the National Assembly does not have the power to change the constitution; It has to be done thought a referendum.

Popular support
Initially part of a party that garnered less than 10% of the votes during the 2017 Armenian parliamentary election, Pashinyan enjoyed near-total support following the velvet revolution. An opinion poll from early May indicated that 98% of respondents had a positive view of the movement that brought him to power. According to the same poll, his party would win a super-majority if parliamentary elections were held then, with some 75% of respondents saying they would vote for Way Out.

The first real test of the popularity of Pashiyan was during the 2018 Yerevan City Council election, where the newly formed My Step Alliance candidate, former actor and comedian Hayk Marutyan, got more than 81% of the vote and won 57 out of 65 seats in the city council. Marutyan was endorsed by Pashinyan, who made multiple appearances during the electoral campaign.

The 2018 Armenian parliamentary election was a turning point for Pashinyan. His party got more than 70% of the vote and won 88 out of 132 seats in the National Assembly. Both the Republican Party of Armenia and the Armenian Revolutionary Federation became extra-parliamentary parties, while Gagik Tsarukyan's Prosperous Armenia lost 5 seats and became the main parliamentary opposition party. The third party in parliament, Bright Armenia, is led by Pashinyan's former ally, Edmon Marukyan.

A year after Pashinyan took office, an International Republican Institute poll shows that the level of support towards the new leader is declining. While in October 2018, the amount of support towards the change of government was viewed positively by 82% of respondents, in May 2019 it got down to 69%. A Gallup (company) poll in December 2019 showed that the approval rating of Pashinyan party got down at 61%, while another poll made by a local outlet showed 45%. 
 
The Armenian Government's handling of the COVID-19 pandemic may drop Pashinyan's approval rating even further, although no polls were conducted because of the pandemic.

Social media presence
Nikol Pashinyan is the first Armenian Premier to use social media as a means of communication. He has Twitter, Facebook, and Instagram official accounts. His Facebook account is by far the most popular, with more than 800 000 followers. He was mentioned on the 2019 top-10 list of world leaders with the most interactions on Facebook.

Resignation

On Sunday 25th of April 2021, Pashinyan announced his resignation from the post of Prime Minister of Armenia, to allow snap parliamentary elections in June of the same year. He will fulfil his duties of interim Prime Minister, until the new prime minister steps into office; that is, of course, if Pashinyan loses the elections and another candidate gets elected.

Domestic Policy

Economy
Fighting corruption
One of the reasons the velvet revolution began was the widespread corruption that took place inside the country's economic system. It was one of the main promises of Pashinyan when he came to power: To establish a rule of law and eradicate the economic power of the Armenian oligarchy. Although he succeeded in breaking some of the monopolies that were established during the near-three decades that preceded his rule, most of the millionaires and oligarchs allied themselves with the new authorities and thus didn't get affected by the crackdown on corruption.

Economic policies
The main problem the new government had to deal with was reduced growth and a decrease in Foreign direct investments after a years of economic successes during Pashinyan's predecessor, Karen Karapetyan's time in office. In 2017, Armenia's GDP grew by 7.5%, while in 2018 it only grew by 5.2% (most of the growth was registered during the period from January to March). By 2019, the trend was reversed and the country saw a 7.6% GDP growth.

In September 2018, Pashinyan proposed a change in the taxation policy. Tax brackets would be eliminated and a 23% flat tax would be used instead. Each year, the amount that is taxed would be reduced by 0.5% until it reaches 20%. The move was heavily criticized by the Armenian Revolutionary Federation (Armenia's biggest socialist party), because it will create a greater gap between the country's richest and poorest citizens. Nevertheless, the move was approved by the parliament in June 2019 and came into force in 2020.

According to political scientist Michael Zoian, "Pashinyan does not have a very transparent economic program, and does not know exactly which model he will adopt. A liberal model with some social guarantees is the most likely. He talks a lot about inequalities." Other analysts have also characterized him as a neoliberal politician with no real plan of action.

Social issues

Relations with the Armenian Apostolic Church
During protests against Catholicos Karekin II, Pashinyan has stated that his government will not interfere in church matters and that the state and church are separate in Armenia. He further stated that he wants the church to have dignity and a good reputation and that his government does not use the church for its political interests. At another rally, Pashinyan embraced Catholic and Evangelical Armenians and stated that Armenians should stay true to their Christian roots and reject "totalitarian sects, which deprive people of freedom and autonomy."

LGBT rights
Pashinyan and his government usually avoid to voice an opinion on LGBT rights in Armenia, despite his embrace of human rights, including LGBT rights. Despite this denial, his government is known for being pro-LGBT.

Healthcare
During Pashinyan's first year in office, the government made healthcare free for all citizens under the age of 18.

A nationwide scandal erupted in December 2019: Doctors and healthcare workers were taking newborn babies from their parents, either by blackmailing them or by telling them that the infant didn't survive. The babies were then smuggled out of the country and sold via an international black adoption market. The scandal involved Armenia's chief gynaecologist, several doctors and health workers, along with immigration and customs employees. Pashinyan promised to bring to justice anyone involved in this scheme.

Foreign policy

Defence
Pashinyan has been heavily criticized by his opponents for being a draft evader and an anti-military activist. Nevertheless, he has advocated for a strong army and a bigger defense budget after getting elected. To help him in doing these changes, he choose Davit Tonoyan, an experienced defense official and war veteran, as Defence minister of Armenia.

The new leadership was criticized for not answering to Azerbaijani provocations and advances on the Armenia-Nakhichevan border in May 2018. After meeting during a CIS summit in Dushanbe, Pashinyan and Ilham Aliyev agreed to calm the situation on the border.

Pashinyan claimed in 2020 that 'large quantities of military equipment were bought during the last 2 years.' The only purchase made public was the order of four Su-30SMs in February 2019. The aircraft were delivered in late December 2019, ahead of schedule.

One of the reforms instigated by Pashinyan was the implementation of a new base cafeteria system. In the previous system, food was given by military logistical units and military chefs. Under the new system, local private companies will organise the cafeteria of bases, while food supply in the field will be provided in the form of rations and field kitchens.

In 2019, Armenia sent a military contingent to Syria. The force consists of 83 medics, demining experts, force protection and other military personnel.

Artsakh

In 2002, Pashinyan's Haykakan Zhamanak reprinted Levon Ter-Petrosyan's 1997 article titled "War or Peace" in which the latter argued for a compromised solution in the Karabakh conflict, which would include loss of control by Armenian forces of several occupied/liberated territories of Azerbaijan. After getting elected, Pashinyan adopted a hardline stance on the issue. He stated in a May 2018 interview: "It is impossible to talk about mutual concessions in the resolution of the conflict when Azerbaijan is trying to destroy the Armenian statehood. Negotiations on mutual concessions will begin only when Azerbaijan recognizes the right of the people of Karabakh to self-determination." Pashinyan visited Stepanakert on May 9, 2018, the day after his election as Prime Minister, to take part in celebrations of the Liberation of Shushi and Victory Day. He stated at a meeting with Artsakh President Bako Sahakyan: "I believe that the format of the negotiations is flawed as long as one of the sides of the conflict—the Artsakh leadership—is not a part of the negotiations." In January 2019 Pashinyan declared that "We can't even discuss the lands-for-peace formula."

Foreign relations

Originally an anti-Russian and pro-European activist, Pashinyan changed his views on foreign policy after getting elected. He considers himself as pro-Armenian and not associated with either Russia or the West.

Pashinyan was a fierce supporter of the Zurich Protocols. In November 2018 he reiterated that Armenia is ready to normalize its relations with Turkey without preconditions, but changed his decision because of increased internal pressure.

References

Pashinyan, Nikol
Nikol Pashinyan
2018 establishments in Armenia